Baroudeur (French: "fighter" or "adventurer") may refer to:

 Baroudeur, a French cycling term for a breakaway specialist
 Baroudeurs de Pia XIII, a French rugby league team
 Les Baroudeurs, the French language title of the 1970 film You Can't Win 'Em All
 SNCASE Baroudeur, a French fighter jet